In Mandaeism, Nidbai is an uthra (angel or guardian) who serves as one of the two guardian spirits of Piriawis, the heavenly yardna (river) in the World of Light. In the Ginza Rabba and Qolasta, he is usually mentioned together with Shilmai.

See also
List of angels in theology
Adathan and Yadathan
Xroshtag and Padvaxtag in Manichaeism

References

Individual angels
Uthras
Water spirits